Scacco Matto is the third studio album by Italian musician Lorenzo Senni. It was released April 24, 2020 under Warp.

Critical reception

Scacco Matto was met with widespread acclaim reviews from critics.  Ross Horton of musicOMH reviewed "Scacco Matto offers the listener an exhausting, exhaustive journey through a kaleidoscopic, hyper-saturated mind." Chal Ravens of Pitchfork said "The rules are fixed but the outcome is unpredictable; within extremely narrow parameters, players can display flair, cunning, and subterfuge."

Cover artwork
The cover artwork is a photograph by John Divola called "Zuma #30".

Track listing

References

2020 albums
Lorenzo Senni albums